Erencan Yardımcı (born 4 February 2002) is a Turkish professional footballer who plays as a forward for Alanyaspor, on loan from Eyüpspor.

Professional career
In July 2019, Yardımcı signed his first professional contract with Galatasaray. Yardımcı made his professional debut for Galatasaray in the 1-1 UEFA Champions League tie with Club Brugge KV on 26 November 2019. He transferred to Eyüpspor in 2021, and helped them get promoted into the TFF First League for the 2020-21 season. He joined Alanyaspor on loan in the Süper Lig for the second half of the 2021-22 season starting 6 January 2022.

International career
Yardımcı is a youth international for Turkey, having played for the Turkey U17s and U18s.

References

External links
 
 
 Yunus Akgün at Galatasaray.org

2002 births
Living people
Sportspeople from İzmit
Turkish footballers
Turkey youth international footballers
Galatasaray S.K. footballers
Eyüpspor footballers
Alanyaspor footballers
Süper Lig players
TFF First League players
TFF Second League players
Association football midfielders